Hong Kong was a colony and later a dependent territory of the British Empire from 1841 to 1997, apart from a period of occupation under the Japanese Empire from 1941 to 1945 during the Pacific War. The colonial period began with the British occupation of Hong Kong Island in 1841, during the First Opium War between the British and the Qing dynasty. The Qing had wanted to enforce its prohibition of opium importation within the dynasty that was being exported mostly from British India, as it was causing widespread addiction among its populace.

The island was ceded to Britain by the Treaty of Nanking, ratified by the Daoguang Emperor in the aftermath of the war of 1842. It was established as a crown colony in 1843. In 1860, the British took the opportunity to expand the colony with the addition of the Kowloon Peninsula after the Second Opium War, while the Qing was embroiled in handling the Taiping Rebellion. With the Qing further weakened after the First Sino-Japanese War, Hong Kong's territory was further extended in 1898 when the British obtained a 99-year lease of the New Territories.

Although the Qing dynasty had to cede Hong Kong Island and Kowloon in perpetuity as per the treaty, the leased New Territories comprised 86.2% of the colony and more than half of the entire colony's population. With the lease nearing its end during the late 20th century, Britain did not see any viable way to administer the colony by dividing it, whilst the People's Republic of China (PRC) would not consider extending the lease or allow continued British administration thereafter.

With the signing of the Sino-British Joint Declaration in 1984, which stated that the economic and social systems in Hong Kong would remain relatively unchanged for 50 years, the British government agreed to transfer the entire territory to China upon the expiration of the New Territories lease in 1997 – with Hong Kong becoming a special administrative region (SAR) until at least 2047.

History

Colonial establishment 

In 1836, the imperial government of the Qing dynasty undertook a major policy review of the opium trade, which had been first introduced to the Chinese by Persian then Islamic traders over many centuries. Viceroy Lin Zexu took on the task of suppressing the opium trade. In March 1839, he became Special Imperial Commissioner in Canton, where he ordered the foreign traders to surrender their opium stock. He confined the British to the Canton Factories and cut off their supplies. Chief Superintendent of Trade, Charles Elliot, complied with Lin's demands to secure a safe exit for the British, with the costs involved to be resolved between the two governments. When Elliot promised that the British government would pay for their opium stock, the merchants surrendered their 20,283 chests of opium, which were destroyed in public.

In September 1839, the British Cabinet decided that the Chinese should be made to pay for the destruction of British property, either by the threat or use of force. An expeditionary force was placed under Elliot and his cousin, Rear-Admiral George Elliot, as joint plenipotentiaries in 1840. Foreign Secretary Lord Palmerston stressed to the Chinese government that the British government did not question China's right to prohibit opium, but it objected to the way this was handled. He viewed the sudden strict enforcement as laying a trap for the foreign traders, and the confinement of the British with supplies cut off was tantamount to starving them into submission or death. He instructed the Elliot cousins to occupy one of the Chusan Islands in the Hangzhou Bay delta across from Shanghai, then to present a letter from himself to a Chinese official for the Emperor of China, then to proceed to the Gulf of Bohai for a treaty, and if the Chinese resisted, then to blockade the key ports of the Yangtze and Yellow rivers. Palmerston demanded a territorial base in the Chusan Islands for trade so that British merchants "may not be subject to the arbitrary caprice either of the Government of Peking, or its local Authorities at the Sea-Ports of the Empire".

In 1841, Elliot negotiated with Lin's successor, Qishan, in the Convention of Chuenpi during the First Opium War. On 20 January, Elliot announced "the conclusion of preliminary arrangements", which included the cession of the barren Hong Kong Island and its harbour to the British Crown. Elliot chose Hong Kong Island instead of Chusan because he believed a settlement nearer to Shanghai would cause an "indefinite protraction of hostilities", whereas Hong Kong Island's harbour was a valuable base for the British trading community in Canton. British rule began with the occupation of the island on 26 January. Commodore Gordon Bremer, commander-in-chief of British forces in China, took formal possession of the island at Possession Point, where the Union Jack was raised under a fire of joy from the marines and a royal salute from the warships. Hong Kong Island was ceded in the Treaty of Nanking on 29 August 1842 and established as a Crown colony after the ratification exchanged between the Daoguang Emperor and Queen Victoria was completed on 26 June 1843.

Growth and expansion 

The Treaty of Nanking failed to satisfy British expectations of a major expansion of trade and profit, which led to increasing pressure for a revision of the terms. In October 1856, Chinese authorities in Canton detained the Arrow, a Chinese-owned ship registered in Hong Kong to enjoy the protection of the British flag. The Consul in Canton, Harry Parkes, claimed the hauling down of the flag and arrest of the crew were "an insult of very grave character". Parkes and Sir John Bowring, the fourth Governor of Hong Kong, seized the incident to pursue a forward policy. In March 1857, Palmerston appointed Lord Elgin as Plenipotentiary, with the aim of securing a new and satisfactory treaty. A French expeditionary force joined the British to avenge the execution of a French missionary in 1856. In 1860, the capture of the Taku Forts and occupation of Beijing led to the Treaty of Tientsin and Convention of Peking. In the Treaty of Tientsin, the Chinese accepted British demands to open more ports, navigate the Yangtze River, legalise the opium trade and have diplomatic representation in Beijing. During the conflict, the British occupied the Kowloon Peninsula, where the flat land was valuable training and resting ground. The area in what is now south of Boundary Street and Stonecutters Island was ceded in the Convention of Peking.

In 1898, the British sought to extend Hong Kong for defence. After negotiations began in April 1898, with the British Minister in Beijing, Sir Claude MacDonald, representing Britain, and diplomat Li Hongzhang leading the Chinese, the Second Convention of Peking was signed on 9 June. Since the foreign powers had agreed by the late 19th century that it was no longer permissible to acquire outright sovereignty over any parcel of Chinese territory, and in keeping with the other territorial cessions China made to Russia, Germany and France that same year, the extension of Hong Kong took the form of a 99-year lease. The lease consisted of the rest of Kowloon south of the Sham Chun River and 230 islands, which became known as the New Territories. The British formally took possession on 16 April 1899.

Japanese occupation 

In 1941, during the Second World War, the British reached an agreement with the Chinese government under Generalissimo Chiang Kai-shek that if Japan attacked Hong Kong, the Chinese National Army would attack the Japanese from the rear to relieve pressure on the British garrison. On 8 December, the Battle of Hong Kong began when Japanese air bombers effectively destroyed British air power in one attack. Two days later, the Japanese breached the Gin Drinkers Line in the New Territories. The British commander, Major-General Christopher Maltby, concluded that the island could not be defended for long unless he withdrew his brigade from the mainland. On 18 December, the Japanese crossed Victoria Harbour. By 25 December, organised defence was reduced into pockets of resistance. Maltby recommended a surrender to Governor Sir Mark Young, who accepted his advice to reduce further losses. A day after the invasion, Chiang ordered three corps under General Yu Hanmou to march towards Hong Kong. The plan was to launch a New Year's Day attack on the Japanese in the Canton region, but before the Chinese infantry could attack, the Japanese had broken Hong Kong's defences. The British casualties were 2,232 killed or missing and 2,300 wounded. The Japanese reported 1,996 killed and 6,000 wounded.

The Japanese soldiers committed atrocities, including rape, on many locals. The population fell in half, from 1.6 million in 1941 to 750,000 at war's end because of fleeing refugees; they returned in 1945.

The Japanese imprisoned the ruling British colonial elite and sought to win over the local merchant gentry by appointments to advisory councils and neighbourhood watch groups. The policy worked well for Japan and produced extensive collaboration from both the elite and the middle class, with far less terror than in other Chinese cities. Hong Kong was transformed into a Japanese colony, with Japanese businesses replacing the British. However, the Japanese Empire had severe logistical difficulties and by 1943 the food supply for Hong Kong was problematic. The overlords became more brutal and corrupt, and the Chinese gentry became disenchanted. With the surrender of Japan, the transition back to British rule was smooth, for on the mainland the Nationalist and Communist forces were preparing for a civil war and ignored Hong Kong. In the long run the occupation strengthened the pre-war social and economic order among the Chinese business community by eliminating some conflicts of interests and reducing the prestige and power of the British.

Restoration of British rule 

On 14 August 1945, when Japan announced its unconditional surrender, the British formed a naval task group to sail towards Hong Kong. On 1 September, Rear-Admiral Cecil Harcourt proclaimed a military administration with himself as its head. He formally accepted the Japanese surrender on 16 September in Government House. Young, upon his return as governor in May 1946, pursued political reform known as the "Young Plan", believing that, to counter the Chinese government's determination to recover Hong Kong, it was necessary to give local inhabitants a greater stake in the territory by widening the political franchise to include them.

Transfer of Sovereignty 

The Sino-British Joint Declaration was signed by both the Prime Minister of the United Kingdom and the Premier of the People's Republic of China on 19 December 1984 in Beijing. The Declaration entered into force with the exchange of instruments of ratification on 27 May 1985 and was registered by the People's Republic of China and United Kingdom governments at the United Nations on 12 June 1985. In the Joint Declaration, the People's Republic of China Government stated that it had decided to resume the exercise of sovereignty over Hong Kong (including Hong Kong Island, Kowloon, and the New Territories) with effect from 1 July 1997 and the United Kingdom Government declared that it would relinquish Hong Kong to the PRC with effect from 1 July 1997. In the document, the People's Republic of China Government also declared its basic policies regarding Hong Kong.

In accordance with the One Country, Two Systems principle agreed between the United Kingdom and the People's Republic of China, the socialist system of People's Republic of China would not be practised in the Hong Kong Special Administrative Region (HKSAR), and Hong Kong's previous capitalist system and its way of life would remain unchanged for a period of 50 years. The Joint Declaration provides that these basic policies shall be stipulated in the Hong Kong Basic Law. The ceremony of the signing of the Sino-British Joint Declaration took place at 18:00, 19 December 1984 at the Western Main Chamber of the Great Hall of the People. The Hong Kong and Macau Affairs Office at first proposed a list of 60–80 Hong Kong people to attend the ceremony. The number was finally extended to 101. The list included Hong Kong government officials, members of the Legislative and Executive Councils, chairmen of The Hongkong and Shanghai Banking Corporation and Standard Chartered Bank, Hong Kong celebrities such as Li Ka-shing, Pao Yue-kong and Fok Ying-tung, and also Martin Lee Chu-ming and Szeto Wah.

The handover ceremony was held at the new wing of the Hong Kong Convention and Exhibition Centre in Wan Chai on the night of 30 June 1997. The principal British guest was Charles, Prince of Wales (King Charles III of the United Kingdom) who read a farewell speech on behalf of the Queen. The newly appointed Prime Minister of the United Kingdom, Tony Blair; the British Foreign Minister, Robin Cook; the departing Governor of Hong Kong, Chris Patten; the Chief of the Defence Staff of the United Kingdom, Field Marshal Sir Charles Guthrie, also attended.

Representing China were the CCP General Secretary and President of China, Jiang Zemin; Premier of China, Li Peng; and Tung Chee-hwa, the first Chief Executive of Hong Kong. This event was broadcast on television and radio stations across the world.

Government 

Hong Kong was a Crown colony of the United Kingdom and maintained an administration roughly modelled after the Westminster system. The Letters Patent formed the constitutional basis of the colonial government and the Royal Instructions detailed how the territory should be governed and organised.

The Governor was the head of government and appointed by the British monarch to serve as the representative of the Crown in the colony. Executive power was highly concentrated with the Governor, who himself appointed almost all members of the Legislative Council and Executive Council and also served as President of both chambers. The British government provided oversight for the colonial government; the Foreign Secretary formally approved any additions to the Legislative and Executive Councils and the Sovereign held sole authority to amend the Letters Patent and Royal Instructions.

The Executive Council determined administrative policy changes and considered primary legislation before passing it to the Legislative Council for approval. This advisory body also itself issued secondary legislation under a limited set of colonial ordinances. The Legislative Council debated proposed legislation and was responsible for the appropriation of public funds. This chamber was reformed in the last years of colonial rule to introduce more democratic representation. Indirectly elected functional constituency seats were introduced in 1985 and popularly elected geographical constituency seats in 1991. Further electoral reform in 1994 effectively made the legislature broadly representative. The administrative Civil Service was led by the Colonial Secretary (later Chief Secretary), who was deputy to the Governor.

The judicial system was based on English law, with Chinese customary law taking a secondary role in civil cases involving Chinese residents. The Supreme Court of Hong Kong was the highest court and ruled on all civil and criminal cases in the colony. During the early colonial period, extraterritorial appellate cases from other regions of China involving British subjects were also tried in this court. Further appeals from the Supreme Court were heard by the Judicial Committee of the Privy Council, which exercised final adjudication over the entire British Empire.

In March 1975 the Hong Kong government introduced a programme to measure public opinion of government efforts, known as Movement of Opinion Direction (MOOD).

Cadets 

In 1861, Governor Sir Hercules Robinson introduced the Hong Kong Cadetship, which recruited young graduates from Britain to learn Cantonese and written Chinese for two years, before deploying them on a fast track to the Civil Service. Cadet officers gradually formed the backbone of the civil administration. After the Second World War, ethnic Chinese were allowed into the service, followed by women. Cadets were renamed Administrative Officers in the 1950s, and they remained the elite of the Civil Service during British rule.

Prior to and during the Second World War, the garrison was composed of British Army battalions and locally enlisted personnel (LEPs) who served as regular members in the Hong Kong Squadron of the Royal Navy or the Hong Kong Military Service Corps and their associate land units. The Hong Kong Brigade served as the main garrison formation. After the outbreak of the Second World War, the garrison was reinforced with British Indian Army and Canadian Army units. A second brigade, the Kowloon Infantry Brigade, was formed to assist in commanding the expanded force. The garrison was defeated during the Battle of Hong Kong, by the Empire of Japan.

Military 

Prior to and during the Second World War, the garrison was composed of British Army battalions and locally enlisted personnel (LEPs) who served as regular members in the Hong Kong Squadron of the Royal Navy or the Hong Kong Military Service Corps and their associate land units. The Hong Kong Brigade served as the main garrison formation. After the outbreak of the Second World War, the garrison was reinforced with British Indian Army and Canadian Army units. A second brigade, the Kowloon Infantry Brigade, was formed to assist in commanding the expanded force. The garrison was defeated during the Battle of Hong Kong, by the Empire of Japan.

After the Second World War and the end of the Japanese occupation of Hong Kong, the British military reestablished a presence. As a result of the Chinese Civil War, the British Army raised the 40th Infantry Division and dispatched it to garrison Hong Kong. It later left for combat in the Korean War, and the defense of the territory was taken up by additional British forces who were rotated from Europe. The garrison was further supplemented by LEPs, and Gurkhas. The latter came from Nepal, but formed part of the British Army. The size of the garrison during the Cold War fluctuated and ended up being based around one brigade.

The Royal Hong Kong Regiment, a military unit which was part of the Hong Kong Government, was trained and organised along the lines of a British Territorial Army unit. As such, it was supported by British Army regular personnel holding key positions. These British Army personnel, for their duration of service to the Royal Hong Kong Regiment, were seconded to the Hong Kong Government. In the post-WWII era, the majority of the regiment's members were local citizens of Chinese descent.

Economy 

The stability, security, and predictability of British law and government enabled Hong Kong to flourish as a centre for international trade. In the colony's first decade, the revenue from the opium trade was a key source of government funds. The importance of opium reduced over time, but the colonial government was dependent on its revenues until the Japanese occupation in 1941. Although the largest businesses in the early colony were operated by British, American, and other expatriates, Chinese workers provided the bulk of the manpower to build a new port city.

By the late 1980s, many ethnic Chinese people had become major business figures in Hong Kong. Amongst these billionaires was Sir Li Ka-shing, who had become one of the colony's wealthiest people by this time.

Culture 

Hong Kong is characterised as a hybrid of East and West. Traditional Chinese values emphasising family and education blend with Western ideals, including economic liberty and the rule of law. Although the vast majority of the population is ethnically Chinese, Hong Kong has developed a distinct identity. The territory diverged from the mainland through its long period of colonial administration and a different pace of economic, social, and cultural development. Mainstream culture is derived from immigrants originating from various parts of China. This was influenced by British-style education, a separate political system, and the territory's rapid development during the late 20th century. Most migrants of that era fled poverty and war, reflected in the prevailing attitude toward wealth; Hongkongers tend to link self-image and decision-making to material benefits. Residents' sense of local identity has markedly increased post-handover: The majority of the population (52%) identifies as "Hongkongers", while 11% describe themselves as "Chinese". The remaining population purport mixed identities, 23% as "Hongkonger in China" and 12% as "Chinese in Hong Kong".

Traditional Chinese family values, including family honour, filial piety, and a preference for sons, are prevalent. Nuclear families are the most common households, although multi-generational and extended families are not unusual. In British-ruled Hong Kong, polygamy was legal until 1971 pursuant to the colonial practice of not interfering in local customs that British authorities viewed as relatively harmless to the public order.

Spiritual concepts such as feng shui are observed; large-scale construction projects often hire consultants to ensure proper building positioning and layout. The degree of its adherence to feng shui is believed to determine the success of a business. Bagua mirrors are regularly used to deflect evil spirits, and buildings often lack floor numbers with a 4; the number has a similar sound to the word for "die" in Cantonese.

Besides, the cultural integration can also be found in everyday life in Hong Kong. For example, British English is a common second language and also one of the official languages in British Hong Kong since the establishment of the colony. Moreover, British English is also taught in primary and secondary schools. For the metro system, the metro lines are named after places instead of numbered, unlike Mainland China, where metro lines are numbered. Roads were named after British royals, governors, famous people, cities and towns across the UK and the Commonwealth, as well as Chinese cities and places. Aside from Chinese New Year, Christmas is celebrated as the second-most important festival. In literature, some idioms in Cantonese are directly translated from those in English. A Mandarin Chinese speaker may recognise the words but not understand the meaning.

Cuisine 

Food in Hong Kong is primarily based on Cantonese cuisine, despite the territory's exposure to foreign influences and its residents' varied origins. Rice is the staple food, and is usually served plain with other dishes. Freshness of ingredients is emphasised. Poultry and seafood are commonly sold live at wet markets, and ingredients are used as quickly as possible. There are five daily meals: breakfast, lunch, afternoon tea, dinner, and siu yeh. Dim sum, as part of yum cha (brunch), is a dining-out tradition with family and friends. Dishes include congee, cha siu bao, siu yuk, egg tarts, and mango pudding. Local versions of Western food are served at cha chaan teng (Hong Kong-style cafes). Common cha chaan teng menu items include macaroni in soup, deep-fried French toast, and Hong Kong-style milk tea.

Cinema 

Hong Kong developed into a filmmaking hub during the late 1940s as a wave of Shanghai filmmakers migrated to the territory, and these movie veterans helped build the colony's entertainment industry over the next decade. By the 1960s, the city was well known to overseas audiences through films such as The World of Suzie Wong. When Bruce Lee's The Way of the Dragon was released in 1972, local productions became popular outside Hong Kong. During the 1980s, films such as A Better Tomorrow, As Tears Go By, and Zu Warriors from the Magic Mountain expanded global interest beyond martial arts films; locally made gangster films, romantic dramas, and supernatural fantasies became popular. Hong Kong cinema continued to be internationally successful over the following decade with critically acclaimed dramas such as Farewell My Concubine, To Live, and Chungking Express. The city's martial arts film roots are evident in the roles of the most prolific Hong Kong actors. Jackie Chan, Donnie Yen, Jet Li, Chow Yun-fat, and Michelle Yeoh frequently play action-oriented roles in foreign films. At the height of the local movie industry in the early 1990s, over 400 films were produced each year; since then, industry momentum shifted to mainland China. The number of films produced annually has declined to about 60 in 2017.

Music 

Cantopop is a genre of Cantonese popular music which emerged in Hong Kong during the 1970s. Evolving from Shanghai-style shidaiqu, it is also influenced by Cantonese opera and Western pop. Local media featured songs by artists such as Sam Hui, Anita Mui, Leslie Cheung, and Alan Tam; during the 1980s, exported films and shows exposed Cantopop to a global audience. The genre's popularity peaked in the 1990s, when the Four Heavenly Kings dominated Asian record charts. Despite a general decline since late in the decade, Cantopop remains dominant in Hong Kong; contemporary artists such as Eason Chan, Joey Yung, and Twins are popular in and beyond the territory.

Western classical music has historically had a strong presence in Hong Kong and remains a large part of local musical education. The publicly funded Hong Kong Philharmonic Orchestra, the territory's oldest professional symphony orchestra, frequently hosts musicians and conductors from overseas. The Hong Kong Chinese Orchestra, composed of classical Chinese instruments, is the leading Chinese ensemble and plays a significant role in promoting traditional music in the community.

Sport and recreation 

Despite its small area, the territory regularly hosts the Hong Kong Sevens, Hong Kong Marathon, Hong Kong Tennis Classic and Lunar New Year Cup, and hosted the inaugural AFC Asian Cup and the 1995 Dynasty Cup.

Hong Kong represents itself separately from mainland China, with its own sports teams in international competitions. The territory has participated in almost every Summer Olympics since 1952 and has earned four medals. Lee Lai-shan won the territory's first Olympic gold medal at the 1996 Atlanta Olympics, and Cheung Ka Long won the second one in Tokyo 2020. Hong Kong athletes have won 126 medals at the Paralympic Games and 17 at the Commonwealth Games. No longer part of the Commonwealth of Nations, the city's last appearance in the latter was in 1994.

Dragon boat races originated as a religious ceremony conducted during the annual Tuen Ng Festival. The race was revived as a modern sport as part of the Tourism Board's efforts to promote Hong Kong's image abroad. The first modern competition was organised in 1976, and overseas teams began competing in the first international race in 1993.

The Hong Kong Jockey Club, the territory's largest taxpayer, has a monopoly on gambling and provides over 7% of government revenue. Three forms of gambling are legal in Hong Kong: lotteries, horse racing, and football.

Dissent 

During China's turbulent 20th century, Hong Kong served as a safe haven for dissidents, political refugees, and officials who lost power. British policy allowed dissidents to live in Hong Kong as long as they did not break local laws or harm British interests. The implementation of this policy varied according to what the senior officials thought constituted British interests and the state of relations with China. The Canton–Hong Kong strike (1925–1926) was anti-imperialist in nature. The 1966 riots and Maoist-led 1967 riots, essentially spillovers from the Cultural Revolution, were large scale demonstrations fuelled by tensions surrounding labour disputes and dissatisfaction towards the government. Although the 1967 riots started as a labour dispute, the incident escalated quickly after the leftist camp and mainland officials stationed in Hong Kong seized the opportunity to mobilise their followers to protest against the colonial government. Chinese Communist Party supporters organised the Anti-British Struggle Committee during the riots.

Steve Tsang, director of the China Institute of the School of Oriental and African Studies at the University of London, wrote that it was "ironic" that despite Hong Kong being a symbol of China's humiliation by Britain, there was not one major movement started by the Chinese residents of the colony for its retrocession to China, even though there had been several upsurges of Chinese nationalism. He explained:
In the 1920s, the working class Chinese of Hong Kong did not have a good reason to rally around the Hong Kong government, and they were more susceptible to appeals based on Chinese nationalism. Consequently, the call of the Communists was basically heeded by the working men, and their actions practically paralysed the colony for a year. By the [end of the] 1960s, however, the attempts by the Hong Kong government to maintain stability and good order which helped improve everyone's living conditions, and ... the beginning of the emergence of a Hong Kong identity, changed the attitude of the local Chinese. They overwhelmingly rallied around the colonial British regime.

See also 
 Emperor of India
 British Military Hospital
 British Education
 Royal Hong Kong Regiment
 Political Department
 Flags of Elizabeth II
 British Forces Overseas Hong Kong 
 Commander British Forces in Hong Kong

Notes

References

Citations

Sources 

 
 
 
 
 
 
 
 
 
 
 
 
 
 
 
 
 .
 
 
 .
 .

Further reading 
Clayton, Adam (2003). Hong Kong Since 1945: An Economic and Social History.
Endacott, G. B. (1964). An Eastern Entrepôt: A Collection of Documents Illustrating the History of Hong Kong. Her Majesty's Stationery Office. p. 293. . .
Lui, Adam Yuen-chung (1990). Forts and Pirates – A History of Hong Kong. Hong Kong History Society. p. 114. .
Liu, Shuyong; Wang, Wenjiong; Chang, Mingyu (1997). An Outline History of Hong Kong. Foreign Languages Press. p. 291. .
Ngo, Tak-Wing (1999). Hong Kong's History: State and Society Under Colonial Rule. Routledge. p. 205. .
Welsh, Frank (1993). A Borrowed Place: The History of Hong Kong. Kodansha International. p. 624. .

External links 

"Official website of the British Hong Kong Government". Archived from the original on 24 December 1996. Retrieved 2013-03-26.

 
Hong Kong and the Commonwealth of Nations
19th century in Hong Kong
20th century in Hong Kong
1841 establishments in Hong Kong
1841 establishments in the British Empire
1997 disestablishments in Hong Kong
Concessions in China
China–United Kingdom relations
Hong Kong
History of Hong Kong
Hong Kong–United Kingdom relations
States and territories established in 1841
States and territories disestablished in 1941
States and territories established in 1945
States and territories disestablished in 1997